The Kabars, also known as Qavars (Qabars) or Khavars<ref>According to the Turcologist András Róna-Tas, the name Kabar" is faulty, the right pronunciation is Khavar. Róna-Tas, András (1996a): A honfoglaló magyar nép. Bevezetés a korai magyar történelem ismeretébe [The conquering Hungarian nation. Introduction to the knowledge of the early Hungarian history]. Budapest: Balassi Kiadó, p. 273</ref> were Khazar rebels who joined the Magyar confederation possibly in the 9th century as well as the Rus' Khaganate.

 Sources 

The Byzantine Emperor Constantine VII is the principal source of the Kabars' history. He dedicated a whole chapterchapter 39to the Kabars (or Kabaroi) in his De Administrando Imperio, which was completed around 950. The Emperor described the Kabars as "a race of Khazars" who had risen up against the Khagan. The uprising was crushed, and some of them were massacred, but others escaped and joined the Magyars in the Pontic steppes.

 History 
The Kabars rebelled against the Khazar Khaganate in the early ninth century; the rebellion was notable enough to be described in Constantine Porphyrogenitus's work De Administrando Imperio. Subsequently the Kabars were expelled from Levedia in the Khazar Khaganate leading the Magyar tribal confederacy called Hét-Magyar (meaning "seven Hungarians") to Etelköz while others under Khan-Tuvan sought refuge by joining the Rus' people. One of the names on the Kievian Letter is "Kiabar", showing that some Kabars settled in Kiev with the Rus' as well. According to Magocsi, "A violent civil war took place during the 820s [...] The losers of the internal political struggle, known as Kabars, fled northward to the Varangian Rus' in the upper Volga region, near Rostov, and southward to the Magyars, who formerly had been loyal vassals of the Khazars. The presence of Kabar political refugees from Khazaria among the Varangian traders in Rostov helped to raise the latter's prestige, with the consequence that by the 830s a new power center known as the Rus' Kaganate had come into existence." 

In 894, the Byzantine emperor Leo VI, then at war with Simeon, the Bulgarian czar (893–927), called the Hungarians to his aid. The Magyars, led by Árpád, crossed the Danube and attacked Bulgaria. The Bulgarians, in turn, appealed to the Pechenegs, now masters of the steppe, who attacked the Hungarians in the rear. Toward 850 or 860, driven from Levedia by the Pechenegs, they entered Atelkuzu (Etelköz) taking refuge in the mountains of Transylvania. At that moment, Arnulf, duke of Carinthia, at war with the Slav ruler Svatopluk, prince of Great Moravia (885–894),  decided like the Byzantines to appeal to the Hungarians. The Hungarians overcame Svatopluk, who disappeared in the conflict (895). The Magyars reached the Danube river basin around 880. As the vanguard and rearguard, the Kabars, or Cowari as they were known in Latin, assisted in the Magyar invasion of Pannonia and the subsequent formation of the Principality of Hungary in the late 9th century. Great Moravia collapsed, and the Hungarians took up permanent abode in Hungary (907).

The presence of a Turkic aristocracy among the Hungarians could explain the Byzantine protocol by which, in the exchange of ambassadors under Constantine Porphyrogenitus, Hungarian rulers were always referred to as "Princes of the Turks".

Archaeological theories on religion
At least some of the Khazar elite apparently converted to Judaism, but this might not have included Kabars. The conversion did not seem have impacted most of the population in the Khazar Khaganate: paganism remained as the religion of majority of the population, and there were also notable Christian and Muslim groups. Since the conversion to Judaism was initiated by the ruler, the theory that the rebels against the ruler would have joined to the conversion has been questioned. There is also debate about the date of Kabars joining to Magyars and it could have happened before the Khazar elite's conversion. Still, according to a theory, graves with Jewish symbols found in modern-day Čelarevo, Serbia could be related to Kabars. 

The Kabars supposedly left scattered remains and some cultural and linguistic imprints, but this is debatable.

The Mihai Viteazu inscription (Alsószentmihály inscription), discovered in the 20th century in present-day Romania, is one of few surviving relics of the Kabars. It was transcribed by the archaeologist-historian Gábor Vékony. According to the transcription, the meaning of the two-row inscription is the following:
(first row) "His mansion is famous." and (second row) "Jüedi Kür Karaite." or "Jüedi Kür the Karaite."''. Karaite Judaism is a movement within Judaism.

See also
 Magyars
 Árpád dynasty
 Aba (genus)
 Khalyzians
 Bulgars
 Avars
 Khazars
 Pechenegs
 Turkic peoples
 Kabardians

References 
Róna-Tas, András (1996): A honfoglaló magyar nép. Bevezetés a korai magyar történelem ismeretébe [The conquering Hungarian nation. Introduction to the knowledge of the early Hungarian history]. Budapest: Balassi Kiadó, 
Khavars in the Rovaspedia
Media Cirebon

Notes

Sources 

 

Hungarian invasions of Europe
Khazars
Jewish Hungarian history
Hungarian tribes and clans
Karaite Judaism
Rovas script